Rimularia exigua is a species of lichen in the family Trapeliaceae. The type collection was found growing on boulders in a eucalypt forest in New South Wales.

References

External links
JSTOR Global plant entry

Baeomycetales
Lichen species
Lichens described in 1989
Lichens of Australia
Taxa named by Hannes Hertel